Kursk is a rural locality (a selo) and the administrative center of Kursky Selsoviet, Kulundinsky District, Altai Krai, Russia. The population was 825 as of 2013. There are 6 streets.

Geography 
Kursk is located 15 km south of Kulunda (the district's administrative centre) by road. Voskresenovka is the nearest rural locality.

References 

Rural localities in Kulundinsky District